Keller Emrick Rockey (September 22, 1888 – June 6, 1970) was a highly decorated Lieutenant General in the United States Marine Corps, who commanded the Fifth Marine Division in the Battle of Iwo Jima during World War II and the Third Amphibious Corps during the occupation of North China following the war.

For outstanding services with the Third Amphibious Corps, he was awarded the Distinguished Service Medal (U.S. Army), and for exceptionally meritorious service with the Fifth Marine Division, he was awarded the Distinguished Service Medal (Navy). The citation for the latter reads in part:

Early life and career
Keller Rockey was born September 22, 1888, in Columbia City, Indiana. He was a graduate of Gettysburg College with a Bachelor of Science degree, and was a student at Yale University. He was commissioned a second lieutenant in the Marine Corps, November 18, 1913.

His first duty assignment as a Marine Corps junior officer was a student under instruction at the Officers Basic School, Norfolk, Virginia. Following graduation there in May, 1915, he went to sea; first as a member of the Marine Detachment aboard , then a member of the Marine detachment aboard .

World War I
Following sea service, Rockey sailed for France in June 1917, and one year later, as a member of the Fifth Marine Regiment, participated in the Aisne-Marne Defensive (Château-Thierry).

He was awarded the Navy Cross for his actions at Château-Thierry where, on July 6, 1918, he performed distinguished service by bringing up supports and placing them in the front lines at great personal exposure, showing exceptional ability and extraordinary heroism.

Rockey also received the Distinguished Service Cross and was cited in the General Orders of the Second Division, American Expeditionary Forces. He was entitled to wear the French Fourragère.

Interwar years

Shortly after returning to the United States in 1919, Rockey went to foreign shore duty in Haiti as a member of the Haitian Constabulary, where he remained until 1921, then returned to this country to join Marine Barracks, Washington, D.C.

Following duty at Headquarters Marine Corps, Washington, D.C., he became a student in the Field Officers' Course, Marine Corps Schools, MCB Quantico, Virginia. After graduation in July 1925, he was again assigned to school, this time as a student at the Command and General Staff School, Fort Leavenworth, Kansas. Upon graduation in June 1926, he became an instructor in the Department of Tactics, Marine Corps Schools.

From January to November 1928, he was commanding officer, First Battalion, Eleventh Artillery Regiment, Second Marine Brigade, stationed in Nicaragua, where he was awarded a Gold Star in lieu of a second Navy Cross for outstanding services.

Rockey next became Base Intelligence, Operations and Training Officer of the MCB San Diego, California, and later Chief of Staff of the Base.

He returned to Washington in July 1939, to assume duties with Operations, Navy Department (War Plans) and in August 1941, became chief of staff of the Second Marine Division the position he was serving in when the United States entered World War II.

World War II

Rockey was assigned duties as director, Division of Plans and Policies at Headquarters Marine Corps, in August 1942, and one year later assumed duties as Assistant Commandant of the Marine Corps. In February 1944, he went to the Pacific where he was successively commanding general of the Fifth Marine Division and the Third Amphibious Corps.

Following deactivation of the Third Amphibious Corps, he assumed command of the First Marine Division (Reinforced), with headquarters at Tientsin, China. He returned to the United States and became commanding general of the Department of the Pacific, San Francisco, California, in September 1946.

Post-war years
On January 1, 1947, he was advanced to lieutenant general (temporary), and the following day assumed command of the Fleet Marine Force, Atlantic with headquarters in Norfolk, Virginia. On July 1, 1949, when he was detached to again become commanding general, Department of the Pacific, San Francisco, California, he returned to his permanent rank of major general. He retired as a lieutenant general on September 1, 1950.

General Rockey died of a heart attack, aged 81, June 6, 1970, in Harwich Port, Massachusetts.

Funeral services with full military honors were held June 11, 1970 at Arlington National Cemetery, Arlington, Virginia.

Decorations and medals

First Navy Cross citation
Citation:

The President of the United States of America takes pleasure in presenting the Navy Cross to Captain Keller Emrick Rockey (MCSN: 0-838), United States Marine Corps, for extraordinary heroism while serving with the First Battalion, 6th Regiment (Marines), 2d Division, A.E.F. in action at Chateau-Thierry, France, on 6 June 1918. Captain Rockey performed distinguished service by bringing up supports and placing them in the front lines at great personal exposure, showing exceptional ability and extraordinary heroism. He was indefatigable and invaluable in carrying forward the attack and organizing and holding the position.

Second Navy Cross citation
Citation:

The President of the United States of America takes pleasure in presenting a Gold Star in lieu of a Second Award of the Navy Cross to Major Keller Emrick Rockey (MCSN: 0-838), United States Marine Corps, for distinguished service in the line of his profession as Commanding Officer, First Battalion, Eleventh Regiment, Second Brigade, U.S. Marine Corps, operating in the Northern Area of Nicaragua from 19 January 1928 to 11 November 1928. Major Rockey displayed great zeal, initiative and sound judgment in planning and leading many combat patrols against the numerous and active bandit groups infesting the practically unexplored area. His courage, ability and good judgment contributed largely to the successful suppression of banditry in the province of Nuevo Segovia and in the northern area.

Distinguished Service Cross citation
Citation:

The President of the United States of America, authorized by Act of Congress, July 9, 1918, takes pleasure in presenting the Distinguished Service Cross to Captain Keller Emrick Rockey (MCSN: 0-838), United States Marine Corps, for extraordinary heroism while serving with the First Battalion, Sixth Regiment (Marines), 2d Division, A.E.F., in action at Chateau-Thierry, France, on 6 June 1918. Captain Rockey performed distinguished service by bringing up supports and placing them in the front lines at great personal exposure, showing exceptional ability and extraordinary heroism. He was indefatigable and invaluable in carrying forward the attack and organizing and holding the position.

References

External links

USMC biography of Keller E. Rockey

1888 births
1970 deaths
Battle of Iwo Jima
United States Marine Corps generals
Gettysburg College alumni
United States Army Command and General Staff College alumni
People from Columbia City, Indiana
People from Harwich, Massachusetts
American military personnel of the Banana Wars
United States Marine Corps personnel of World War I
United States Marine Corps World War II generals
Recipients of the Navy Cross (United States)
Recipients of the Distinguished Service Cross (United States)
Recipients of the Navy Distinguished Service Medal
Recipients of the Distinguished Service Medal (US Army)
Officiers of the Légion d'honneur
Burials at Arlington National Cemetery
Military personnel from Massachusetts